Tengku Iskhan Shah bin Tengku Haidar or better known by his stage name Que Haidar  is a Malaysian actor.

Personal life
Que decided to retire from acting as a surprise in 2010 after marrying the choreographer Linda Jasmine.

Filmography

Film

Television series

Telemovie

Discography

Singles

Awards and nominations

References

External links
 

1979 births
Living people
Malaysian male actors
People from Johor